Club Deportivo Real Juventud is a Honduran football club based in Santa Bárbara, Santa Bárbara.

The club currently plays in the Honduran second division, after being promoted from the Honduran top tier in summer 2011.

History
Real Juventud was founded in 1966. Since their foundation, Real Juventud used to play in the Fraternidad Junquera league in Santa Barbara. In 1983, the club started playing in Liga Nacional de Ascenso de Honduras after they bought a category in that league. For the rest of their history, they played in Liga de Ascenso de Honduras until 2008 when they earned a promotion to Liga Nacional de Honduras, the highest league in Honduras, by winning both Apertura and Clausura championships after defeating Arsenal FC from Roatán and Social Sol from Olanchito respectively.

Their games for the 2008/2009 Apertura tournament will be televised by Honduran Channel 11. Since playing in Liga de Ascenso de Honduras, Real Juventud has had a working relationship with Marathon. For the upcoming tournament, Marathon has promised to loan out players to Real Juventud that are not part of the plans of their manager Manuel Keosseian.

Relegation and merge with Gualala
Before the start on the 2009–10 Apertura season, Atlético Gualala achieved promotion to first division on 2008–09, however before the start of the tournament they choose to merge with Real Juventud who had recently relegated the same season, and then decided to stay with the name Real Juventud.

Juventud were relegated in April 2010 after they had 4 points deducted after a group of former players claimed the club still owed them money. This decision by the National Arbitration Tribunal saved Deportes Savio from the drop.

Achievements
Liga de Ascenso
Winners (2): 2007–08 A, 2007–08 C
Runners-up (1): 2005–06 C

League performance

References

External links
 Official Website

Football clubs in Honduras
Association football clubs established in 1965
1965 establishments in Honduras